Lorenzo Wiebers (born 2 February 1977 in Paramaribo) is a footballer from Suriname who played for SV Robinhood.

Career
Wiebers began his career for Surinamese side Royal '95 before transferring to Trinidad and Tobago team Tobago United.

International career
He plays for the Suriname national football team.

References

External links
 
 

1977 births
Living people
Surinamese footballers
Suriname international footballers
Surinamese expatriate footballers
Tobago United F.C. players
S.V. Robinhood players
Sportspeople from Paramaribo
TT Pro League players
SVB Eerste Divisie players
Expatriate footballers in Trinidad and Tobago
Surinamese expatriate sportspeople in Trinidad and Tobago
Association football defenders